Kalateh-ye Dowlat (also Romanized as Kalāteh-ye Dowlat; also known as Dowlat) is a village in Qasabeh-ye Gharbi Rural District, in the Central District of Sabzevar County, Razavi Khorasan Province, Iran. At the 2006 census, its population was 145, in 34 families.

References 

Populated places in Sabzevar County